The 2015 TLC: Tables, Ladders & Chairs was the seventh annual TLC: Tables, Ladders & Chairs professional wrestling pay-per-view and livestreaming event produced by WWE. It took place on December 13, 2015, at the TD Garden in Boston, Massachusetts. This was the last TLC event to be held before the reintroduction of the brand extension in July 2016.

Eight matches were contested at the event, including one match on the Kickoff pre-show. In the main event, Sheamus defeated Roman Reigns in a Tables, Ladders, and Chairs match to retain the WWE World Heavyweight Championship. On the undercard, Dean Ambrose defeated Kevin Owens to win the WWE Intercontinental Championship and in the opening match, The New Day (Big E and Kofi Kingston) defeated The Lucha Dragons and The Usos to retain the WWE Tag Team Championship.

Production

Background 
TLC: Tables, Ladders & Chairs was an annual gimmick pay-per-view (PPV) and WWE Network event, produced every December by WWE since 2009. The concept of the show was based on the primary matches of the card each containing a stipulation using tables, ladders, and chairs as legal weapons, with the main event generally being a Tables, Ladders, and Chairs match. The 2015 event was the seventh event under the TLC chronology. It was scheduled to take place on December 13, 2015, at the TD Garden in Boston, Massachusetts.

Storylines 
The card consisted of eight matches, including one of the Kickoff pre-show, that resulted from scripted storylines, where wrestlers portrayed villains, heroes, or less distinguishable characters in scripted events that built tension and culminated in a wrestling match or series of matches, with results predetermined by WWE's writers. Storylines between the characters played out on WWE's primary television programs, Raw and SmackDown.

At Survivor Series, Roman Reigns defeated Dean Ambrose in a tournament final to win the vacant WWE World Heavyweight Championship, but Sheamus then cashed in his Money in the Bank contract and defeated Reigns to win the title. The following night on Raw, Sheamus was scheduled to defend the championship against Reigns in a Tables, Ladders, and Chairs match at the event. On the November 30 episode of Raw, Reigns received an early title match, in which he would win the title if he could defeat Sheamus in under 5:15; Reigns won the match by disqualification, but he did not win the title.

On the November 26 episode of SmackDown, Dean Ambrose defeated Tyler Breeze and Dolph Ziggler in a triple threat match to earn an Intercontinental Championship match against Kevin Owens at the event.

On the November 30 episode of Raw, The Lucha Dragons and The Usos faced in a number-one contender's match for The New Day's WWE Tag Team Championships, where The New Day attacked both teams, causing a double-disqualification. Stephanie McMahon decided that, because neither team lost, both would challenge the champions in a triple threat tag team ladder match at the event.

At Survivor Series, Charlotte defeated Paige via submission to retain the WWE Divas Championship. On the following night on Raw, Paige argued that Charlotte had cheated to retain the title, and received a rematch, which ended in a double countout. Following this, another rematch was scheduled for TLC.

On the November 23 episode of Raw, Bray Wyatt and Luke Harper defeated The Dudley Boyz. The Dudley Boyz then defeated Braun Strowman and Erick Rowan on the next episode of SmackDown. The next week on Raw, Tommy Dreamer returned to WWE and joined The Dudley Boyz, after which the two groups fought to a no contest. On the December 3 of SmackDown, Wyatt defeated D-Von Dudley. On the December 7 episode of Raw, Rhyno returned to WWE, joining The Dudleyz, after which an 8-man tag team elimination tables match pitting The Dudleyz, Dreamer and Rhyno against The Wyatt Family was scheduled for the event.

On the November 30 episode of Raw, Ryback interrupted Lana's return and defeated Rusev by countout in an impromptu match. After a rematch the following week on Raw, which ended in a double countout, a match was scheduled between the two at the event.

At Hell in a Cell, Alberto Del Rio made his return to the WWE, to win his first United States Championship; while joining forces with manager Zeb Colter, leading to confrontations with Colter's former protege, Jack Swagger. After Del Rio ended his association with Colter on the December 7 episode of Raw, a title defense against Swagger in a chairs match was scheduled to take place at the event.

Event

Pre-show 
During the TLC: Tables, Ladders & Chairs Kickoff pre-show, Sasha Banks faced Becky Lynch. In the end, Becky applied the Dis-Arm-Her on Sasha but Tamina distracted the referee whilst Naomi kicked Becky. Sasha forced Becky to submit to the Banks Statement to win the match.

Preliminary matches 
The actual pay-per-view event opened with The New Day's Big E and Kofi Kingston defending the WWE Tag team Championship against The Usos (Jey Uso and Jimmy Uso) and The Lucha Dragons (Kalisto and Sin Cara) in a triple threat tag team ladder match. During the match, Kingston - with the help of Big E - dropkicked a ladder into Jey Uso, who was seated in the ring corner. Big E then executed an Overhead Belly to Belly Suplex into the ladder on Jimmy Uso. Later in the match, Jimmy and Jey dropkicked a ladder into Big E. Jimmy performed a Running Hip Attack into a ladder which Jey held against Kingston, who was hung in the Tree of Woe. Kalisto performed a Salida Del Sol on Jey through a ladder bridged between another ladder and the ring ropes. The match ended when Xavier Woods threw his trombone at Kalisto, who was about to retrieve the title belts. Kingston retrieved the belts to retain the championship.

Next, Rusev faced Ryback. In the end, Ryback attempted Shell Shocked on Rusev but Rusev countered the move and performed a Roundhouse Kick on Ryback. Rusev applied the Accolade on Ryback, who passed out, giving Rusev the win.

After that, Alberto Del Rio defended the United States Championship against Jack Swagger in a Chairs match. During the match, Swagger attempted a Swagger Bomb on Del Rio but Del Rio countered with a chair shot to Swagger's midsection. Swagger applied a Patriot Lock whilst Del Rio's ankle was trapped inside a chair but Del Rio escaped the hold. The match ended when Del Rio executed a Diving Double Foot Stomp on Swagger, who was hung in the Tree of Woe, onto a pile of chairs and pinned Swagger to retain the championship.

In the fourth match, The Wyatt Family (Bray Wyatt, Luke Harper, Erick Rowan, and Braun Strowman) faced The ECW Originals (Bubba Ray Dudley, D-Von Dudley, Tommy Dreamer, and Rhyno) in an eight-man tag team elimination tables match. Erick Rowan was eliminated after Bubba Ray and D-Von put him through a table with a 3D. Rhyno was eliminated by Harper after getting hit by a Big Boot causing Rhyno to fall through a table. D-Von was eliminated by Wyatt after a Uranage Slam through a table. Dreamer was eliminated after Harper performed a Suicide Dive on Dreamer, pushing him through a table. Bubba Ray poured lighter fluid on a table but Strowman put him through a table with a Chokeslam to win the match for The Wyatt Family.

Next, Kevin Owens defended the Intercontinental Championship against Dean Ambrose. During the match, Ambrose performed a Suicide Dive on Owens and attempted a Rebound Lariat but Owens countered with a Fallaway Slam into the barricade on Ambrose, which he followed by a Running Senton. Owens performed a Super Rolling Fireman's Carry Slam on Ambrose for a near-fall. Owens attempted a Pop Up Powerbomb but Ambrose countered the move and executed Dirty Deeds. Ambrose pinned Owens but Owens placed a finger on the bottom rope to void the pinfall. In the end, Owens attempted a Pop Up Powerbomb but Ambrose countered with a Hurricanrana and pinned Owens with a roll-up to win the Intercontinental Championship.

In the sixth match, Charlotte (with Ric Flair) defended the WWE Divas Championship against Paige. During the match, Paige performed a Ram-Paige on Charlotte but Ric Flair placed Charlotte's foot on the bottom rope to void the pinfall. The match ended when Charlotte removed the cover from a turnbuckle and tripped Paige into the exposed turnbuckle, pinning Paige to retain the title.

Main event
In the main event, Sheamus defended the WWE World Heavyweight Championship against Roman Reigns in a Tables, Ladders, and Chairs match. During the match, Reigns threw Sheamus into chairs set up on tables near the entrance way. Reigns attempted a Powerbomb on Sheamus but Sheamus countered with a Back Body Drop through a table, followed by a Drop Suplex through another table and White Noise off the steel steps through another table. Sheamus attempted a Rolling Fireman's Carry Slam but Reigns countered the move and executed a Deadlift Powerbomb onto a ladder on Sheamus, followed by a Samoan Drop through a ladder bridged between the ring and a broadcast table. Reigns knocked Sheamus off a ladder with a Superman Punch, causing Sheamus to fall through a table. In the climax, Reigns attempted to retrieve the title belt but Rusev and Alberto Del Rio pulled him off the ladder; Del Rio performed a Superkick on Reigns. Reigns executed Superman Punches on Rusev and Del Rio and pulled Sheamus off the ladder but Sheamus executed a Brogue Kick on Reigns. Sheamus retrieved the belt to retain the title.

After the match, Sheamus, Rusev, and Del Rio were celebrating until Reigns performed a double Spear on Rusev and Del Rio and attacked Sheamus with a chair. Triple H, Stephanie McMahon, and WWE officials attempted to calm down Reigns, who, however, attacked Triple H with a Superman Punch, several chair shots, and a Powerbomb on a broadcast table, ending the attack with an Elbow Drop through the broadcast table. As medical personnel attempted to help Triple H out, Reigns delivered a Spear to Triple H.

Reception 
The event received generally mixed reviews from critics, though it was considered a major improvement from the previous pay-per-view.

James Caldwell of Pro Wrestling Torch reviewed the event's matches out of 5 stars: the tag title opener received 4.25 stars with "a lot of chaos and crash & burn’ing", and "Kalisto’s Salida del Sol off the ladder was the highlight of the match." The U.S. title match and the Intercontinental title match also received the same rating, the former having Del Rio "solid in victory" while "no one seemed to think Swagger had a chance of winning", while for the latter was a "solid match, but not long enough to get to that next level." Ryback-Rusev received 2 stars: "Just a placeholder that didn’t seem to move either guy since Ryback keeps losing and Rusev isn’t taken seriously anymore." Two matches were unrated: the tables match, where "the hardcore team was just there to help re-establish the Wyatts after the Wyatts went through a series of big losses", and the women's match, where Ric Flair "was a distraction from whatever match they were trying to have between two unlikable characters with no sympathy for Paige." Lastly, the main event was rated 3 stars, as Roman Reigns and Sheamus "tried hard, but the crowd just wasn't into either guy at the main event level."

Nick Tylwalk of Canadian Online Explorer wrote that "TLC sends the year out on a blah note for the WWE". The event was rated 6.5/10, as "an acceptable though uninspiring affair that at least seemed to get some new fans cheering for Reigns before the show faded to black." The best rated match was the tag title match at 8.5/10, the worst being Rusev-Ryback at 5/10: "the expressionless face emoji sign in the crowd says it all." For the other matches, Del Rio-Swagger was rated 6/10, the tables match 7/10, Ambrose-Owens 7.5/10 and Charlotte-Paige 5.5/10. The main event, "featuring the least inspiring pairing since the promotion’s two top titles were combined into one" and eventually "overshadowed by what followed", was rated 6.5/10: "That it won't go down as anyone’s favorite was hardly surprising, though it wasn't for a lack of effort on the part of the wrestlers."

Will Pruett of Pro Wrestling Dot Net gave the show a rating of "B−", saying that even though it was "a really good live special with two standout matches bookending it", "the grade was hurt by the storytelling going in and some of the middling-to-bad matches." The main event was "a great TLC match", and when Reigns "got angry" and "sought vengeance" post-match, Pruett praised it as Reigns "seemed to finally find himself after a year of searching". However, Pruett was "confused" when Reigns beat down Triple H twice, going "from a sympathetic release of frustrations to being the true aggressor in the situation ... One has to wonder who the good guy in this feud actually is." The ladder match was "frenetic, entertaining, dynamic, and fun", but it could not mask that "this was a Ladder Match for the sake of having a Ladder Match because December [is] the month where Ladder Matches happen." For the other matches, Del Rio and Swagger had the "best" chairs match Pruett had seen, though "the bar wasn't high". Also, the tables match was "clumsy" and the women's match was poorly wrestled.

Aftermath 
On the following night's edition of Raw, Roman Reigns was confronted by Stephanie McMahon and Mr. McMahon. After Reigns refused to apologize, Sheamus came to request a match with Reigns that night, putting his WWE World Heavyweight Championship on the line. Mr. McMahon made the match official under the condition that if Reigns failed to win the title, he would be fired. Despite interference from McMahon and The League of Nations, Reigns pinned Sheamus to win his second WWE World Heavyweight Championship.

On the December 28 episode of Raw, John Cena, who had lost the United States Championship to Alberto Del Rio at Hell in a Cell, returned from a two-month hiatus and challenged Del Rio for the United States Championship that night. The ensuing title match ended in a disqualification win for Cena, after The League of Nations interfered and attacked Cena. On the January 7 episode of SmackDown, after Del Rio refused another title match, Cena introduced Kalisto of The Lucha Dragons; Kalisto won a non-title match against Del Rio and defeated Del Rio again on the January 11 episode of Raw to win the United States Championship.

On the following night of Raw, after losing the Intercontinental Championship, Kevin Owens interfered in a match between new champion Dean Ambrose and Dolph Ziggler and attacked both men, ending the match in disqualification. On Tuesday, December 22, during the live special SuperSmackDown, Ambrose retained the Intercontinental Championship after defeating Ziggler and Owens in a Triple Threat match. Ambrose retained the Intercontinental Championship against Owens on the January 7, 2016 episode of SmackDown after their match ended in a double countout. On the January 14 episode of SmackDown, Ambrose challenged Owens to a Last Man Standing Match for the Intercontinental Championship at Royal Rumble, which Owens accepted.

On the December 14 episode of Raw, The Wyatt Family defeated The Dudley Boyz, Tommy Dreamer, and Rhyno, in an Extreme Rules match. On the December 21 episode of Raw, The Dudley Boyz and Dreamer faced The Wyatt Family, this time with Kane in a losing effort. The Dudley Boyz lost once again to the Wyatts on the following night's live special SuperSmackDown, while teaming with Kane and Ryback.

Charlotte's heel persona continued to strain her friendship with Becky Lynch after the event. On the following night's Raw, Charlotte and Becky defeated Brie Bella and Alicia Fox after Ric Flair's interference allowed Becky to lock Alicia in submission for the win. On the December 17 episode of SmackDown, Becky defeated Brie by submission due to interference by Charlotte. On the special SuperSmackDown show, Charlotte defeated Bella by submission while also leaving Becky to be assaulted by Team B.A.D. On the January 4, 2016 episode of Raw, Becky defeated Charlotte by roll-up despite Ric Flair interfering on his daughter's behalf. After the match Charlotte attacked Becky, turning both her and her father into villains. Charlotte defeated Becky with help from Flair to retain the Divas Championship on the January 7 episode of SmackDown.

The 2015 event would be the last TLC event held before the reintroduction of the brand extension in July 2016, which again split WWE's main roster between the Raw and SmackDown brands where wrestlers were exclusively assigned to perform. The 2016 event was in turn held exclusively for wrestlers from the SmackDown brand.

Results

Elimination tables match eliminations

Other on-screen personnel

References

External links 

2015
Events in Boston
2015 in Boston
2015 WWE Network events
Professional wrestling in Boston
2015 WWE pay-per-view events
December 2015 events in the United States